The Stone Bridge is a 1637 landscape painting by the Dutch Golden Age painter Rembrandt in the collection of the Rijksmuseum.

Painting 
This painting was documented by Hofstede de Groot in 1915, who wrote:

The picture is currently documented as being in the collection of Augustin Lapeyrière, based presumably on the Hofstede de Groot catalog. Before him, Smith wrote:

Probably M. Perrier refers to Augustin Lapeyrière, because it was sold on 14 April 1817, lot nr. 46, in Paris. The auction catalogue of May 12, 1900 stated that it was in the collection of James Gray of Versailles in 1863, which Hofstede de Groot repeated. Since Waagen had seen the painting in the collection of the Marquess of Landsdowne in 1850, this was however impossible.

See also
List of paintings by Rembrandt
Landscape with Arched Bridge, a similar painting in the collection of the Gemäldegalerie, Berlin

References

Sources
Landscape with a stone bridge in the Rembrandt database

Paintings by Rembrandt
1630s paintings
Paintings in the collection of the Rijksmuseum
Bridges in art